Sergio Alejandro Gioino Ponce (born 27 March 1974) is an Argentine former professional footballer who played as a forward.

Honours
Universidad de Chile
 Primera División de Chile: 2004 Apertura

References
 

1974 births
Living people
Argentine footballers
Association football forwards
Primera B de Chile players
Chilean Primera División players
Provincial Osorno footballers
Coquimbo Unido footballers
C.D. Huachipato footballers
Deportes Iquique footballers
Unión Española footballers
Club Deportivo Universidad Católica footballers
Universidad de Chile footballers
Naturalized citizens of Chile
Argentine expatriate footballers
Argentine expatriate sportspeople in Chile
Expatriate footballers in Chile
Argentine expatriate sportspeople in Brazil
Expatriate footballers in Brazil
Footballers from Buenos Aires